Georgy Ruslanovich Balakshin (born March 6, 1980, in Antonovka, near Nyurba, Sakha Republic) is an Olympic boxer from Russia best known for winning the European title three times.

Career

Balakshin won the gold medal 2002 and defended the crown at the 2004 European Amateur Boxing Championships in Pula.
He participated in the 2004 Summer Olympics for his native Russia. There he was stopped in the quarterfinals of the Flyweight (51 kg) division by Cuba's eventual winner Yuriorkis Gamboa Toledano.

In 2005 he was part of the Russian team that won the 2005 Boxing World Cup.

2006 he once again won the European title.
At the World championships 2007 he beat Frenchman Jérôme Thomas but lost to eventual winner Rau'shee Warren.

At the 2011 European Amateur Boxing Championships he won silver.

Olympic results 
2004 (as a flyweight)
Defeated Bonyx Yusak Saweho (Indonesia) 26-19
Defeated Mirzhan Rakhimzhanov (Kazakhstan) 29-20
Lost to Yuriorkis Gamboa (Cuba) 18-26

2008 (as a flyweight)
1st round bye
Defeated Mirat Sarsembayev (Kazakhstan) 12-4
Defeated Jitender Kumar (India) 15-11
Lost to Andry Laffita (Cuba) 8-9

World amateur championships results 
2003 (as a flyweight)
Defeated Akhil Kumar (India) 26-16
Defeated Hermensen Ballo (Indonesia) 22-8
Lost to Alexander Vladimirov (Bulgaria) 24-33

2005 (as a flyweight)
Defeated Bradley Hore (Australia) 25-11
Defeated Atagun Yalcinkaya (Turkey) 36-15
Lost to Rau'shee Warren (United States) 21-31

2007 (as a flyweight)
Defeated Jérôme Thomas (France) 25-11
Defeated Nurlan Aydarbek Ulu (Kyrgyzstan) RSCI 3
Defeated Jitender Kumar (India) 14-9
Lost to Rau'shee Warren (United States) 13-23

References

External links
 Yahoo! Sports
 

1980 births
Living people
Flyweight boxers
Boxers at the 2004 Summer Olympics
Boxers at the 2008 Summer Olympics
Olympic boxers of Russia
Olympic bronze medalists for Russia
Olympic medalists in boxing
Medalists at the 2008 Summer Olympics
Russian male boxers
Sportspeople from Sakha
North-Eastern Federal University alumni
AIBA World Boxing Championships medalists